Nikom Rayawa (born 1944 in Sukhothai) is a Thai novelist.

He holds a bachelor's degree in Economics from Thammasat University, where he began his writing career. While there, he was the founder of the University's first writer's group.
In addition to being a novelist, he has also worked on palm and cocoa plantations as well as being involved in the Thai petroleum industry.

In 1988, he received the S.E.A. Write Award.

Writings in English
 High Banks, Heavy Logs; English translation by Richard C. Lair. Australia : Penguin, 1991.

References

Nikom Rayawa
1944 births
Living people
Nikom Rayawa
Nikom Rayawa
Nikom Rayawa
Nikom Rayawa